Eduardo José Corona (1 September 1925 – 22 March 2008) was a Portuguese footballer who played as forward.

He represented various clubs in the Primeira Divisão but was best known for his time at Benfica, where he won five major titles, including the Latin Cup.

Career
Born in Barreiro, Portugal, Corona played for Sporting Lavradiense and Luso Futebol Clube in his youth years. He joined Benfica in 1945 but had to wait over a year to make his debut, which arrived on 24 November 1946, in the league opener with Porto.

Competing with players like Guilherme Espírito Santo, Rogério Pipi and Julinho, he nonetheless received significant playing time, averaging about 20 games per year. Corona's best season at Benfica was 1948–49, when he scored 23 goals, 15 in the league. During his time at Benfica, he won the league title once, the Taça de Portugal four times, and he added an international trophy, the Latin Cup in 1950.

In 1953, he moved to Braga, representing them for two years, before moving to Vitória de Setúbal. His last year in the top tier was 1957–58, when he played for his home-town club, Barreirense.

Honours
Benfica
Primeira Divisão: 1949–50 
Taça de Portugal: 1948–49, 1950–51, 1951–52, 1952–53
Latin Cup: 1949–50

References
General
 

Specific

External links
 

1925 births
2008 deaths
Sportspeople from Barreiro, Portugal
Portuguese footballers
S.L. Benfica footballers
S.C. Braga players
Vitória F.C. players
F.C. Barreirense players
U.F.C.I. Tomar players
Amora F.C. players
Primeira Liga players
Association football forwards